The Usambara blotched blind-snake (Afrotyphlops usambaricus) is a species of snake in the Typhlopidae family.

References

Afrotyphlops
Reptiles described in 1964